The Cavalcade of Dreams (Italian:La cavalcata dei sogni) is a 1917 Italian silent film directed by Roberto Roberti and starring Bice Valerian.

Cast
 Piera Bouvier 
 Antonietta Calderari 
 Roberto Roberti 
 Domenico Serra 
 Bice Valerian

References

Bibliography
 Moscati, Italo. Sergio Leone: quando il cinema era grande. Lindau, 2007.

External links

1917 films
1910s Italian-language films
Films directed by Roberto Roberti
Italian silent feature films
Italian black-and-white films